David Welch Pogue (born March 9, 1963) is an American technology and science writer and TV presenter. He is an Emmy-winning correspondent for CBS News Sunday Morning and author of the "Crowdwise" column in The New York Times Smarter Living section.

He has hosted 18 Nova specials on PBS, including NOVA ScienceNow, the Making Stuff series in 2011 and 2013, and Hunting the Elements in 2012. Pogue has written or co-written seven books in the For Dummies series (including Macintosh computers, magic, opera, and classical music).

In 1999, he launched his own series of computer how-to books called the Missing Manual series, which now includes more than 100 titles covering a variety of Mac and Windows operating systems and applications. Among the dozens of books Pogue has authored is The World According to Twitter (2009), written in collaboration with around 500,000 of his Twitter followers, and Pogue's Basics (2014), which was a New York Times bestseller.

On October 21, 2013, Pogue announced he would be leaving The New York Times after 13 years in order to join Yahoo!, where he would create a new consumer-technology Web site. At the 2014 Consumer Electronics Show, Pogue joined Yahoo! CEO Marissa Mayer onstage during her keynote speech to throw the "on" switch for that new site, Yahoo! Tech. On November 13, 2018, Pogue announced his return to the Times as the writer of the "Crowdwise" feature for the "Smarter Living" section.

Since 2012, Pogue has served as the emcee for the annual National Academy of Television Arts and Sciences Technical and Engineering Emmys ceremony in Las Vegas.

Early years
Pogue was born in Shaker Heights, Ohio, the son of Richard Welch Pogue, an attorney and former managing partner at Jones, Day, Reavis & Pogue, and Patricia Ruth Raney. He is a grandson of aviation attorney L. Welch Pogue and Mary Ellen Edgerton. He is also a great nephew of Harold Eugene Edgerton, a professor of electrical engineering at the Massachusetts Institute of Technology.

Pogue graduated from Yale University in 1985 summa cum laude, earning a bachelor's degree in music. He spent ten years working in New York, for a time in the office of Music Theatre International and also intermittently as a conductor and arranger in Broadway musicals.

Career

Pogue wrote for Macworld magazine from 1988–2000. His back-page column was called The Desktop Critic. Pogue got his start writing books when Macworld owner IDG asked him to write Macs for Dummies to follow on the success of the first ...For Dummies book, DOS For Dummies, written by Dan Gookin.

Starting in November 2000, Pogue served as the personal-tech columnist The New York Times; his column, "State of the Art," appeared each Thursday on the front page of the Business section. He also wrote "From the Desk of David Pogue," a tech-related opinion column sent to readers by e-mail. He also maintained a blog at nytimes.com called Pogue's Posts.

He joined CBS News Sunday Morning as a correspondent since 2002, writing and hosting stories on technology, science, the environment, and show business.

From 2007 to 2011, Pogue appeared on CNBC's Power Lunch in a taped, three-minute comic tech review, which then appeared on the New York Times website, nytimes.com, as well as iTunes, YouTube, TiVo, and JetBlue.

In 2007, the Discovery HD and Science channels aired his six-episode series, It's All Geek to Me, a how-to show about consumer technology.

From 2010 to 2019, Pogue wrote a monthly column for Scientific American called "Techno Files."

He hosted a four-part PBS NOVA miniseries about materials science called Making Stuff, which aired on four consecutive Wednesdays starting January 19, 2011, on PBS. It was followed by a two-hour special about the periodic table, Hunting the Elements, which aired April 4, 2012. He hosted a further series, Making More Stuff, on PBS NOVA on four consecutive Wednesdays starting October 16, 2013.

Taking up where Hunting the Elements left off, Pogue hosted a three-part PBS NOVA series Beyond the Elements, about how key molecules and chemical reactions paved the way for life on earth, including humans and their civilizations. The series aired on February 3, 2021.
 
Pogue is a frequent speaker at educational and government conferences, addressing such topics as disruptive technology, social media, digital photography, and why products fail. He has performed three times at TED conferences: in 2006, a 20-minute talk about simplicity; in 2007, a medley of high-tech song parodies at the piano (or, as Pogue joked, "a tedley,"); and in 2013, offering tips everyone should know ("a driver's ed for tech"). In 2008, he performed at the EG conference, also in Monterey, talking about cellphones, the tricks they can be made to do, and how the phones are often better than the companies that market them.

Consumer advocacy
In his columns and blog posts in The New York Times, Pogue launched several high-profile consumer advocacy initiatives. His campaigns have caused corporations to change practices and marketing claims that Pogue said were unfair or misleading.

In July 2009, Pogue launched "Take Back the Beep." The campaign was designed to raise consumer awareness about American cellphone carriers’ mandatory 15-second voice mail instructions. Pogue wrote that the instructions are unnecessary, as most everyone knows "what to do at the beep." However, because consumers can’t easily turn the instructions off (if at all), the instructions eat into consumers’ voice plan minutes. "I calculated that if Verizon’s 87 million customers leave or check messages twice each business day, that comes out to $750 million of air time a year — your money and your time, listening to pointless instructions over and over again." Pogue explained how consumers could bypass the voice mail instructions,  encouraged readers to complain about the practice to their carriers, and provided links where they could file complaints. Other media outlets reported on the "Take Back the Beep" campaign, including radio stations and blogs such as Gizmodo, Engadget, The Consumerist, and Technologizer. As a result of the "Take Back the Beep" campaign, AT&T shortened its voicemail instructions to eight seconds down from 12 or 15, though no other carriers followed suit and Verizon Wireless did not respond to the campaign.

In November 2009, Pogue reported on a Verizon customer’s complaint that the wireless carrier charged $1.99 for "bogus data downloads" every time an internet connection was established, even if the user did not intend to use the connection. The practice was validated by a reader who claimed to work for Verizon. The charge resulted whenever a Verizon customer touched the up-arrow key on some Verizon phones. The key is easy to hit accidentally and is preprogrammed by Verizon to launch the mobile Web, causing the consumer to incur a $1.99 data charge each time the key is pressed.  As a result of Pogue’s reportage, the Federal Communications Commission (FCC) asked Verizon to explain the data charge. In October 2010, in response to the FCC inquiry, Verizon agreed to pay up to $90 million in refunds to 15 million customers "wrongly charged for data sessions or Internet use," one of the largest refunds by a telecommunications company.

In January 2010, Pogue reported that Barnes & Noble claimed its Nook e-reader weighed 11.2 ounces, though Pogue found it weighed 12.1 ounces. He wrote that the discrepancy was "a rather important fib in a product that you have to hold in your hand for hours at a time." Barnes & Noble claimed that "higher than anticipated demand" for the Nook created "minor variances in the manufacturing process" resulting in a "marginal weight difference…making Nook 12.1 ounces." The company said it would update all references to the weight.

Pogue took Barnes & Noble to task again in November 2011 for claiming that its Nook Color Tablet allowed users to view movies and TV shows in high definition. However, the device’s screen resolution is 1,024 x 600 pixels, below the lowest-quality HD format of 720p, which has a screen resolution of 1,280 x 720 pixels. In response, Barnes & Noble agreed that consumers might be misled by the HD video claims and eliminated nine such references from its Web site and from its marketing literature.

Awards
In 2004, Pogue won a Business Emmy as the correspondent for two CBS News Sunday Morning stories about Google and spam for taking "complex technological applications such as Google or Spam and [making] them comprehensible to the ordinary, non-technophile viewer."

Shenandoah Conservatory awarded Pogue an honorary doctorate in music in August 2007 for "his unique imagination of the boundary between music as a classical discipline and the computer of the future, and his artistic contributions".

In 2008, Pogue received a Society of Business Editors and Writers Best in Business Journalism award for his New York Times video, The iPhone Challenge: Keep it Quiet.

On May 5, 2009, Pogue won two Webby Awards. His New York Times online video series "was the only winner in multiple categories, earning nods for Best Reality/Variety Host and Technology."

His blog, "Pogue’s Posts" in The New York Times, received the 2010 Gerald Loeb Award for Online Commentary & Blogging.

In 2011, Pogue won the second "Golden Mouth Organ" award on The Late Late Show with Craig Ferguson for being the second person on the show who, when presented with a harmonica, could actually play it.

In 2013, Pogue was named an Honorary Fellow of the Society for Technical Communication

Media appearances
Pogue was featured in the cover story of the March–April 2011 issue of Making Music magazine about how he integrates music into his career.

Controversy
In a 2005 New York Times review of a hard drive recovery service, Pogue noted that the service, which can cost from $500 to $2,700, was provided to him at no charge for the purposes of the review; but when describing the service for National Public Radio's Morning Edition program on September 12, 2005, he neglected to mention this. NPR's Vice President of News Bill Marimow later stated that NPR should have either not aired the review or paid for the services itself. Ultimately, the Times paid for the service.

In September 2009, Pogue's New York Times review of the Snow Leopard Macintosh operating system, a product for which he had also authored a Missing Manual book, was the subject of a column by The Times Public Editor Clark Hoyt. Hoyt wrote that Pogue's "multiple interests and loyalties raise interesting ethical issues." Of three ethicists Hoyt consulted, each agreed Pogue's position created a "clear conflict of interest" and placed the paper on "tricky ethical terrain." In response, Pogue posted a statement of ethics on his Times Topics page and a disclosure was added to his Snow Leopard review on The Times web site.

In June 2011, Pogue gave a presentation at the Media Relations Summit sponsored by Ragan Communications in which he offered advice to PR professionals on how to successfully pitch him. Arthur S. Brisbane, The New York Times reader representative, subsequently wrote that the paper’s ethics policy states staff members and freelancers on assignment "may not advise individuals or organizations how to deal successfully with the news media." Though Pogue is not a Times staff member and was not on assignment, an internal review determined that his presentation was not appropriate. In an email to Brisbane about the matter, Pogue wrote that in the future, "my speaking agent will now present every offer to my [Times] editor and me simultaneously."

Works

Nonfiction
 

CSS: the Missing Manual
David Pogue's Digital Photography: The Missing Manual
The Flat-Screen iMac For Dummies
GarageBand: the Missing Manual
GarageBand 2: the Missing Manual
The Great Macintosh Easter Egg Hunt
How to Prepare for Climate Change: A Practical Guide to Surviving the Chaos
The iBook For Dummies
iLife '04: The Missing Manual
iLife '05: The Missing Manual
The iMac For Dummies
iMovie: The Missing Manual
iMovie 2: The Missing Manual
iMovie 3 & iDVD: The Missing Manual
iMovie 4 & iDVD: The Missing Manual
iMovie HD & iDVD 5: The Missing Manual
iMovie 6 & iDVD: The Missing Manual
iMovie '08 & iDVD: The Missing Manual
iMovie '09 & iDVD: The Missing Manual
iMovie '11 & iDVD: The Missing Manual
iPhoto: The Missing Manual
iPhoto 2: The Missing Manual
iPhoto 4: The Missing Manual
iPhoto 5: The Missing Manual
iPhoto 6: The Missing Manual
iPhoto '08: The Missing Manual
iPhoto '09: The Missing Manual
iPhoto '11: The Missing Manual
Mac OS 9: The Missing Manual
Mac OS X: The Missing Manual
Mac OS X Hints (with Rob Griffiths)
Macs For Dummies
Macworld Mac Secrets (6 total editions) (with Joseph Schorr)
Magic For Dummies
The Microsloth Joke Book: A Satire (editor)
More Macs For Dummies
Opera For Dummies (with Scott Speck)
PalmPilot: The Ultimate Guide
Switching to the Mac: The Missing Manual
Tales from the Tech Line: Hilarious Strange-But-True Stories from the Computer Industry's Technical-Support Hotlines (editor)
The Weird Wide Web (with Erfert Fenton)
Windows Me: The Missing Manual
Windows Vista: The Missing Manual
Windows Vista for Starters: The Missing Manual
Windows XP Home Edition: The Missing Manual
Windows XP Pro: The Missing Manual
The World According to Twitter
Windows 8.0: The Missing Manual
Windows 8.1: The Missing Manual
Windows 10: The Missing Manual
Windows 10 May 2019 Update: The Missing Manual
Pogue's Basics: Essential Tips and Shortcuts (That No One Bothers to Tell You) for Simplifying the Technology in Your Life
Pogue's Basics: Life: Essential Tips and Shortcuts (That No One Bothers to Tell You) for Simplifying Your Day

Fiction
  Reprint 1995: Ace. Mass market paperback edition: Diamond Books
 "Abby Carnelia's One and Only Magical Power" (2010, novel for middle-schoolers)

Personal life
In 2011 Pogue and his wife Jennifer were charged with disorderly conduct following a domestic dispute in their home in Westport, Connecticut. Protective orders were issued for both. The Pogues were in the process of obtaining a divorce. Pogue's charges were later dropped.

References

External links

 Official website
 Making Stuff, 2011 Nova science series on PBS
 Hunting Elements, 2012 Nova science series on PBS
 David Pogue at O'Reilly Media
 
 Pogue's Posts blog
 
 
 
 
 Yahoo Tech

1963 births
Living people
American technology writers
Gerald Loeb Award winners for News Service, Online, and Blogging
O'Reilly writers
Writers from Shaker Heights, Ohio
Scientific American people
The New York Times columnists
Yahoo! people
Yale University alumni
Journalists from Ohio